The 2004 Superfund Euro Formula 3000 Series was contested over 10 rounds. 10 different teams and 25 different drivers competed. All teams raced with Lola chassis (Lola T99/50) and Zytek engines.

Driver and Team Lineup

Calendar

Results

Drivers' Championship

Teams Championship

References

External links
Official Euroseries 3000 site

Formula 3000
Auto GP
Euro Formula 3000